Ephraim Williams  (1877 – 1954) was a Welsh international footballer. He was part of the Wales national football team between 1901 and 1902, playing five matches. He played his first match on 2 March 1901 against Scotland and his last match on 3 March 1902 against England. At club level, he played for Chirk and Druids.

See also
 List of Wales international footballers (alphabetical)

References

1877 births
1954 deaths
People from Chirk
Sportspeople from Wrexham County Borough
Welsh footballers
Wales international footballers
Association footballers not categorized by position